Kotovo is a rural locality (a selo) in Starooskolsky District, Belgorod Oblast, Russia. The population was 944 as of 2010. There are 18 streets.

Geography 
Kotovo is located 15 km east of Stary Oskol (the district's administrative centre) by road. Ilyiny is the nearest rural locality.

References 

Rural localities in Starooskolsky District